The Journal of Celtic Linguistics is a peer-reviewed annual academic journal established in 1992 with the goal of encouraging and publishing original linguistic research in the Celtic languages. The journal is published by the University of Wales Press, but has specialist editors in all six Celtic languages. The current editor-in-chief, since volume 16, is Simon Rodway (Aberystwyth University), who replaced Graham Isaac (National University of Ireland, Galway).

External links 
 

Celtic languages
Linguistics journals
Annual journals
University of Wales
Publications established in 1992
English-language journals